Nordhordland is a traditional district in the western part of Norway.  The district consists of the northern portion of the old Hordaland county (now in Vestland county), north of the city of Bergen.  It includes the municipalities Alver, Austrheim, Fedje, Masfjorden, Modalen, Osterøy, and Vaksdal.  The district roughly corresponds to the Nordhordland prosti, a Church of Norway deanery and also to the municipalities that fall under the Nordhordland District Court.  Historically, the municipality of Gulen to the north was included in the district.

Name
The meaning of the name is "the northern part of Hordaland". (See also Sunnhordland.)

Geography
The landscape of Nordhordland is mountainous, but the mountains are not as high as in other areas.

The fjords in the outer regions generally run in a northwesterly-southeasterly run. The main fjords in the district are the Hjeltefjorden in the outermost part and the Fensfjorden and Masfjorden in the north.  The Osterfjorden-Romarheimsfjorden runs through the central part of the district.

Some of the largest islands in the district include Osterøy, Holsnøy, Radøy, Fosnøyna, and Fedje.

Economy
Nordhordland has many well-developed islands, with much more undeveloped, rural inland areas.  The largest urban areas are Knarvik (5013 inhabitants), Frekhaug (2335 inhabitants), Dale (1174 inhabitants), and Lindås (1263 inhabitants). The largest industry in the district is the large oil refinery at Mongstad in Lindås and Austrheim.  Manufacturing is the largest industry as a whole, but farming and fishing are most common in the more rural areas both inland and along the coast.  There are several large fish farming operations in the coastal areas.  Considerable hydro-electric power is produced in the inner parts of the district, especially in Vaksdal, Modalen, and Masfjorden.

References

 
Districts of Vestland